Darío Debray Silva Pereira (born 2 November 1972) is a Uruguayan retired professional footballer who played as a striker.

After making a name for himself in his country and in Italy with Cagliari, he spent the following seven years of his career in Spain – scoring 48 La Liga goals in 163 games, mostly for Málaga – before moving to England. He suffered a serious car accident shortly after leaving Portsmouth, which caused him to lose a leg and effectively end his career.

Amongst other tournaments, Silva represented Uruguay at the 2002 World Cup, winning nearly 50 caps.

Club career

Peñarol and Cagliari
Born in Treinta y Tres in the namesake department, Silva began his career in 1991 with Defensor Sporting (having been a Boca Juniors player for six hours previous to that), signing shortly after with Montevideo and Primera División powerhouse Peñarol; 
 
In 1995, aged 22, he switched to Italy and signed with Cagliari Calcio, where he was nicknamed Sa pibinca (Sardinian for nuisance) due to his frenzied attacking style. In his last season he helped the club return to Serie A, posting his best individual record with 13 goals; during his three-year spell, he also briefly returned to Peñarol on loan.

Spain and Portsmouth
Silva then moved to Spain, where he would remain for nearly one full decade. He started at RCD Espanyol where he failed to impress, and signed for Málaga CF in 1999. With the Andalusians he formed an efficient attacking partnership with Julio Dely Valdés, also helping to the conquest of the 2002 UEFA Intertoto Cup and consecutive mid-table La Liga finishes; during his tenure with the club, the temperamental player was also sent off six times.

In 2003, aged nearly 31, Silva joined Málaga neighbours Sevilla FC. Two years later, as the club purchased Luís Fabiano, Frédéric Kanouté and Javier Saviola, he was deemed surplus to requirements by manager Joaquín Caparrós and cancelled the last year of his contract, joining Premier League side Portsmouth on a free transfer.

At Pompey, Silva failed to make an impact after suffering an ankle injury and, after scoring just three goals in 15 appearances, he was released from his contract on 13 February 2006. He found the net against Charlton Athletic, Sunderland and Ipswich Town, the latter in the third round of the FA Cup.

Car crash
On 23 September 2006, Silva was seriously injured in a car crash in Montevideo. The accident occurred when he lost control of his pick-up truck and was thrown from the vehicle, colliding with a lamppost. In the impact, the 33-year-old Silva fractured his skull, being rendered unconscious and suffering a compound fracture on his right leg. At the time of the crash, he was traveling with two other ex-footballers, Elbio Papa and Dardo Pereira, who were not seriously injured.

On the day of the accident, a team of five made the decision to amputate Silva's leg below the knee, and he underwent an operation which lasted for three and a half hours. He was put into a medically induced coma for the amputation. After the operation, there were fears that the amputation would become infected. However, his condition was declared stable a few days later as he recovered at Montevideo's La Española hospital, whose staff expected him to make a full recovery.

After difficulty with coming to terms with the amputation, Silva left the hospital on 5 October 2006, and returned to his home in Montevideo with the plan of receiving a prosthetic leg in Italy to help him walk and run without the aid of crutches.

International career
Silva made his debut for Uruguay on 19 October 1994, in a friendly match against Peru in the Estadio Nacional José Díaz in Lima (1–0 win). He appeared for the national team at the 1997 FIFA Confederations Cup, the 2002 FIFA World Cup – no goals in three matches in an eventual group stage exit– and the 2004 Copa América.

Silva retired from international play after Uruguay failed to qualify to the 2006 World Cup in Germany, having played 49 times and scored 14 goals.

After retirement
In October 2006, news reports suggested that Silva was offered a job as a football pundit in his country. He had also expressed a desire to become a manager shortly before retiring, but later changed his mind. He took the pitch again on 13 January 2009 after a three-year absence, taking part in a charity match between Uruguay XI and Argentina XI for the “Fundación Niños con Alas” (Winged Children Foundation), again displaying his scoring touch after converting a penalty kick.

Afterwards, Silva was involved in breeding of racing horses, also recommending the animal for therapeutic purposes. In May 2019, rumours circulated that he was broke and working as a waiter in a pizzeria in Málaga; shortly after, he denied this and stated he was only a friend of the person who ran the business.

Honours
Peñarol
Uruguayan Primera División: 1993, 1994, 1995

Málaga
UEFA Intertoto Cup: 2002

References

External links

1972 births
Living people
People from Treinta y Tres
Uruguayan people of Spanish descent
Uruguayan footballers
Association football forwards
Uruguayan Primera División players
Defensor Sporting players
Peñarol players
Serie A players
Serie B players
Cagliari Calcio players
La Liga players
RCD Espanyol footballers
Sevilla FC players
Málaga CF players
Premier League players
Portsmouth F.C. players
Uruguay under-20 international footballers
Uruguay international footballers
1997 FIFA Confederations Cup players
2002 FIFA World Cup players
2004 Copa América players
Uruguayan expatriate footballers
Expatriate footballers in Italy
Expatriate footballers in Spain
Expatriate footballers in England
Uruguayan expatriate sportspeople in Italy
Uruguayan expatriate sportspeople in Spain
Uruguayan expatriate sportspeople in England
Uruguayan amputees